HMS Vanessa has been the name of more than one ship of the British Royal Navy, and may refer to:

 , an armed yacht in service from 1914 to 1919 which saw service in World War I
 , a destroyer in commission from 1918 to 1921 and from 1939 to 1945 which saw service in World War I and World War II

Royal Navy ship names